Peace International School is a private institution in  Kerala, Head office in Kozhikode founded by M. M. Akbar, an Islamic scholar, a religious orator and an expert in comparative religion.
The school follows CBSE syllabus. It consists over 2200 students and 250 staff members

System of education

Primary School: LKG to Class 4
The Primary School programme comprises Lower and Upper Kindergarten (LKG and UKG) years and classes I to IV. In classes LKG to IV, the school follows an integrated curriculum by drawing on teaching programmes of the Council for the Indian School Certificate Examinations and international examination boards.

Middle School: Class 5 to Class 7
The Middle School Programme i.e. classes 5 to 7.

Secondary school
The school offers the following in class VIII, where students prepare for the programme that they will study in classes IX and X: ICSE Programme.

List of schools in Kerala
 Kottakkal
 Mathilakam
 Vengara
 Chakkaraparambu
 Kasargode
 Payangadi
 Trikaripur
 Manjeri

See also
 List of schools in Ernakulam district
 List of schools in Kerala

References

External links
 

Private schools in Kochi
Schools in Kozhikode
Boarding schools in Kerala
Educational institutions established in 1991
1991 establishments in Kerala